Narendra Modi, parliamentary leader of the Bharatiya Janata Party, started the first tenure of his prime ministership, after his swearing-in as the 14th Prime Minister of India on 26 May 2014. 45 other ministers were also sworn in along with Modi. The ceremony was noted by media for being the first ever swearing-in of an Indian Prime Minister to have been attended by the heads of all SAARC countries.

Background

Post the declaration of election results on 16 May 2014, Modi met the President of India Pranab Mukherjee on 20 May where Mukherjee invited Modi to form the next government. The BJP had won 282 seats and their alliance National Democratic Alliance won a total of 336 seats in the 543-seat Lok Sabha, the strongest mandate since the 1984 elections where Indian National Congress had won. The BJP then announced that Modi would be sworn in on 26 May 2014 at 6 p.m. Modi's actual oath was made at 6:13 p.m. IST.

Ceremony
The swearing-in ceremony was held at the forecourts of the Rashtrapati Bhavan in Delhi which has been used as the venue of swearing-in by only two previous Prime Ministers, Chandra Shekhar (1990, Samajwadi Janata Party) and Atal Bihari Vajpayee (1996 and 1998, BJP). The Durbar Hall was another possible venue but was rejected for its small sitting capacity of 500. BJP indicated that the ceremony would be held in open ground. Before, Modi has taken his oath as Chief Minister of Gujarat in open stadiums. Extra trains were scheduled from Varanasi and Gujarat on the previous day for viewers to reach Delhi. The special “K9” squad of trained dogs belonging to the Indo-Tibetan Border Police was employed to secure the areas of the venue. The squad has previously been used at the time of 2010 Commonwealth Games and other Naxal-affected regions. India's national broadcaster Doordarshan had various innovative ways planned. The ceremony's broadcast had an anchor in inset narrating the event in sign-language. This had previously been used in the Republic Day parade broadcast, but was the first time for a swearing-in. In another first, the 15 regional television channels of Doordarshan aired the ceremony in the respective regional languages. The event was also the first of its kind to ever be streamed live on YouTube. The ceremony cost the President's Estate ₹34 lakh.

Invitees 
The guest-list includes various heads of the states, political parties and groups along with leaders of SAARC countries. The event is hence viewed as a "major diplomatic event".

International dignitaries

All SAARC heads of government attended. The ceremony was the first swearing-in of an Indian Prime Minister where all SAARC heads were invited. After the ceremony, Modi described this new government's first major initiative in foreign policy as the "right decision at the right time".

 – President Hamid Karzai accepted the invitation to attend the ceremony. He is bound to leave the office post the ongoing presidential elections. But his acceptance was seen as Afghanistan's interest in working with India in future. Media also noted that his either successors Abdullah Abdullah and Ashraf Ghani are pro-India.
  - Shirin Sharmin Chaudhury, the speaker of Jatiyo Sangshad, (the House of the Nation) accepted the invitation on behalf of the Prime Minister Sheikh Hasina as Hasina had a pre-planned visit to Japan.
  - Prime Minister Tshering Tobgay attended the ceremony and planned to have a discussion on bilateral relations of the two countries on 27 May.
  -  Maldivian President Abdulla Yameen Abdul Gayoom attended the ceremony.
  - Mauritius Prime Minister Navin Ramgoolam attended the ceremony.
  - Nepal Prime Minister Sushil Koirala accepted the invitation.
  - Indian politicians reacted strongly after Nawaz Sharif accepted the invitation to the swearing-in ceremony on May 24. National Conference's (NC) Omar Abdullah was glad that the Pakistan PM had accepted the invitation to Modi's swearing-in. He said that this would mark a new beginning in Indo-Pakistani ties. Key National Democratic Alliance (NDA) ally Shiv Sena, which has been vocal against Pakistan for sponsoring terrorism in India, came out opposing the invitation to the Pakistan Prime Minister. Pakistani journalists and politicians however had mixed views on Sharif accepting the invitation.
 - President Mahinda Rajapaksa's invitation and attendance to the ceremony came under heavy criticism amongst Tamil Nadu politicians. The All India Anna Dravida Munnetra Kazhagam (AIADMK) and NDA ally Marumalarchi Dravida Munnetra Kazhagam (MDMK) leaders had spoken against the Modi government's decision to invite the Sri Lankan president. MDMK chief Vaiko met Modi to try to change his mind about the invitation while the Congress leaders were one with the MDMK and the AIADMK opposing the invitation. Amid strong opposition from all quarters, CPI(M) on Sunday said the centre should utilise this occasion for resolving the Lankan Tamils issue. A Tamil students group called Delhi Tamil Youth Forum staged a protest in the streets of Delhi on Sunday to register their anger. Due to Modi's goodwill and peaceful approach, Indian fishermen were released by Pakistan and Sri Lanka. Pakistan released 151 fishermen on 25 May from the Malir jail in Karachi and  Nara jail in Hyderabad in Sindh province. Modi welcomed this move of both the nations.

The prime minister of the Tibetan Government-in-Exile, Lobsang Sangay, attended the ceremony. The Chinese government opposed the invitation to the Tibetan leader.

National dignitaries
Outgoing Prime Minister Manmohan Singh, former Presidents A. P. J. Abdul Kalam and Pratibha Patil, Vice President Hamid Ansari, Congress president Sonia Gandhi were among those who participated. Chief Ministers of all states in India were invited to attend the event. Among them, the Chief Minister of Karnataka, Siddaramaiah (INC) and Chief Minister of Kerala, Oommen Chandy (INC) could not attend the ceremony due to their prior engagements though they gave their best wishes. The Chief Minister of Tamil Nadu, J. Jayalalithaa (AIADMK), whose party had won the third highest number of seats in the election also declined to attend the event, while the Chief Minister of West Bengal, Mamata Bannerjee (AITC), decided to send Mukul Roy and Amit Mitra to attend. Chief Minister of Madhya Pradesh, Shivraj Singh Chouhan of the BJP and his entire cabinet had hired an aircraft to attend the swearing in and return to Bhopal the same night.

Celebrities who were invited to the event included Salman Khan, Dharmendra, Anupam Kher, Madhur Bhandarkar, Suresh Gopi, Vivek Oberoi, Lata Mangeshkar, Rajnikanth and Amitabh Bachchan.

Kiran Mahida, a tea vendor from Vadodara who had proposed Modi's candidacy, was also invited to attend the ceremony.

Ravi Raushan want to make it a special day for the people." Diwali like celebrations were done in Shimla to mark the "end of ten years of Congress rule". Similar celebrations have been planned in Gujarat, the home state of Modi. The Southern Gujarat Hotel and Restaurant Association (SHRA) announced a list of 48 restaurants and fast food joints across Surat that will serve free tea to people between 6- 9pm IST. Vadodara, Modi's constituency called it a "Vadodara Pride Day". Along with similar celebrations, educational stationary was also distributed in Vadodara to the school children. Religious worships were planned in the temples, mosques and gurudwaras of Indore, Madhya Pradesh. 5,000 laddus were ordered to be distributed by the Mysore Zilla Ganigara Sangha community in Mysore, Karnataka.

Celebrations were also carried out in the Times Square of New York City and other cities of United States of America by organizing "election watch parties". An Indian restaurant in New Jersey also promised free methi pakodas if Modi won the elections. Similar festivities were also seen amongst the Indians settled in Australia and Canada.

References

External links
 

Ceremonies in India
State ritual and ceremonies
Narendra Modi
2014 in Indian politics
Oaths